Dujmović is a surname. Notable people with the surname include:

Davor Dujmović, Bosnian Serb actor
Miroslav Dujmović (born 1978), Bosnian footballer
Tomislav Dujmović (born 1981), Croatian footballer
Vida Dujmović, Yugoslav-Canadian computer scientist and mathematician

See also
Dujmovits

Serbian surnames
Croatian surnames